West End Historic District, or Westend Historic District, and variations with Commercial or Old or other, may refer to:

in the United States
(by state)
West End Historic District (Santa Rosa, California)
West End North Historic District (Hartford and West Hartford, Connecticut), listed on the National Register of Historic Places (NRHP) in Hartford County, Connecticut
West End South Historic District (Hartford and West Hartford, Connecticut), listed on the NRHP in Hartford County, Connecticut
West End Historic District (New Britain, Connecticut), listed on the NRHP in Hartford County, Connecticut
West End Commercial District (Winsted, Connecticut), listed on the NRHP in Litchfield County, Connecticut
West End Historic District (Atlanta, Georgia), listed on the NRHP in Fulton County
West End Historic District (Augusta, Georgia)
Harrisburg-West End Historic District, Augusta, GA, listed on the NRHP in Richmond County, Georgia
West End Historic District (Decatur, Illinois), listed on the NRHP in Macon County, Illinois
West End Historic District (Fort Wayne, Indiana), listed on the NRHP in Allen County, Indiana
Old West End Historic District (Muncie, Indiana), listed on the NRHP in Delaware County, Indiana
West End Historic District (Meridian, Mississippi), listed on the NRHP in Mississippi
West End Historic District (Kings Mountain, North Carolina), listed on the NRHP in Cleveland County, North Carolina
West End Historic District (Winston-Salem, North Carolina), listed on the NRHP in Forsyth County, North Carolina
Old West End District (Toledo, Ohio), listed on the NRHP in Lucas County, Ohio
Alphabet Historic District, Portland, Oregon, also known as "Portland West End Historic District"
West End Commercial Historic District (Greenville, South Carolina), listed on the NRHP in Greenville County, South Carolina
Columbia West End Historic District, Columbia, Tennessee, listed on the NRHP in Maury County, Tennessee
Hillsboro-West End Historic District, Nashville, Tennessee, listed on the NRHP in Davidson County, Tennessee
Richland-West End Historic District, Nashville, Tennessee, listed on the NRHP in Davidson County, Tennessee
West End Historic District (Nashville, Tennessee)
West End Historic District (Dallas, Texas), listed on the NRHP as Westend Historic District
West End Historic District (Waxahachie, Texas), listed on the NRHP in Ellis County
West End Historic District (Suffolk, Virginia), listed on the NRHP in Suffolk County, Virginia

Geography of Maury County, Tennessee